Klairi Angelidou (born 19 November 1932 - 1 April 2021) was a Cypriot educator, philologist, poet, translator, and politician.

Biography
Born in Ammochostos, Famagusta, Angelidou was educated at the School of Philosophy at the University of Athens. In 1955 she married Nicos Angelides, with whom she has three sons. She began her educational career as a teacher at a gymnasium in 1956, continuing until 1962, when she became assistant headmistress; she became headmistress in 1980 and remained in the position until 1991. An honorary member of the International Women's Association, she was also the Honorary President of the Cyprus Language Association and the Lions Club Arsinoe; she has received honorary degrees from the University of Athens and the University of Middlesex. She was elected to the House of Representatives in 1991. Two years later, she was appointed Minister of Education and Culture, in which role she continued until 1997. She has continued to be active in political affairs in retirement.

Angelidou has published fourteen volumes of poetry, and numerous works in a variety of other forms. Her poetry has been translated into numerous languages, and set to music by such composers as Marios Meletiou and Giorgos Theophanous.

Selected publications
Her works include:
Poiemata (1967)
Tou Xerizomou (Uprooting) (1975)
Nostimon Imar (1982)
En Demo Anathountos (1988)
Pentadaktylos, My Son (1991)
The Silence of Statues (1994)

References

1932 births
2021 deaths
Cypriot women writers
Cypriot poets
Cypriot women poets
20th-century poets
20th-century women writers
21st-century poets
21st-century women writers
Women government ministers of Cyprus
Members of the House of Representatives (Cyprus)
20th-century Cypriot women politicians
20th-century Cypriot politicians
People from Famagusta
20th-century Cypriot educators
National and Kapodistrian University of Athens alumni
Cypriot translators
20th-century translators
21st-century translators
Cyprus Ministers of Education and Culture
20th-century women educators
Cypriot expatriates in Greece